The 2008 South American Aquatics Championships, or  Campeonato Sudamericano de Primera Fuerza de Deportes Acuáticos (as they were called in Spanish), were held March 12–16, 2008, in São Paulo, Brazil. The Championships were an event of CONSANAT, the South American Swimming Confederation, and featured competitions in diving, swimming, open water swimming, synchronized swimming and water polo.

The swimming competition at the Championships served as a qualifying event for the 2008 Olympics.

The water polo competition served as the South American qualifier for the UANA Cup: the Americas qualifier for the 2009 World Championships.

Diving

Men's results

Women's results

Point standings

Swimming
Note: Competition was in a long course (50 m) pool.

Men's results

Women's results

Records

10 South American Records were set in:
 Men's 100 m backstroke: 54.67, Guilherme Guido, Brazil
 Men's 100 m breaststroke: 1:01.44, Henrique Barbosa, Brazil
 Women's 100 m freestyle: 55.73, Tatiana Lemos, Brazil
 Women's 200 m freestyle: 2:00.62, Monique Ferreira, Brazil
 Women's 50 m backstroke: 28.45, Fabíola Molina, Brazil
 Women's 100 m backstroke: 1:01.40, Fabíola Molina, Brazil
 Women's 50 m breaststroke: 32.53, Valéria Merea, Peru
 Women's 50 m butterfly: 27.48, Gabriella Silva, Brazil
 Women's 100 m butterfly: 59.79, Gabriella Silva, Brazil
 Women's 400 m medley relay: 4:11.53, Brazil (Molina, Sakemi, Silva, Lemos)

Additionally, 8 Championship Records (CRs) were set in:
 Men's 200 m freestyle: 1:50.41, Rodrigo Castro, Brazil
 Men's 50 m backstroke: 25.19, Guilherme Guido, Brazil
 Men's 50 m breaststroke: 28.40, Felipe Lima, Brazil
 Men's 50 m butterfly: 23.88, Nicholas Santos, Brazil
 Men's 400 m individual medley: 4:17.64, Thiago Pereira, Brazil
 Men's 800 m freestyle relay: 7:33.30, Venezuela
 Women's 50 m freestyle: 25.25, Flávia Delaroli Cazziolato, Brazil
 Women's 400 m freestyle: 4:13.77, Monique Ferreira, Brazil

Open water swimming
Note: Competition dates were March 7 (5 km) and March 9 (10 km).

Men's results

Women's results

Team results

Note: Based on fastest total time of compiled 3 fastest times (male and female) per country in both events.

Synchronized swimming

Results

T=Technical program score; F=Free program score (each weights equally)

Point standings

*Aruba is not a normal CONSANAT member, and only competed in the synchro solo competition at these Championships.

Water polo
Game winners are italicized.

Men's tournament

Women's tournament

Final standings

Overall medals table

External links
Event page on the Brazilian Swimming Federation website 

2008 in water sports
S
2008 in swimming
Swimming competitions in South America
2008 in South American sport
International sports competitions in São Paulo
March 2008 sports events in South America